Milton High School is a public high school located in Milton, Massachusetts, United States, educating grades 9 through 12 with over a thousand students enrolled.

Academics

Milton High School offers Advanced Placement courses in twenty-three subjects, including: Music Theory, Studio Art, English Language & Composition,
English Literature & Composition, US History, European History, US Government and Politics, Macroeconomics, Microeconomics, Psychology, Spanish Language, Spanish Literature, French Language, Latin, Calculus AB, Calculus BC, Statistics, Computer Science Principles, Computer Science A, Biology, Chemistry, Physics 1, and Physics 2.

Sports

The athletic teams compete in the Bay State Conference. The Wildcats boys basketball team won State Championships in 1988, 1996 and 2009. Boys lacrosse won the state championship in 2000. In 2007 and 2008 the girls ice hockey team came in second in the state in division 2. In 1986 & 1991 girls field hockey won the MIAA division 2 championship. In 2009, the Boys Basketball team won the MIAA Division 2 State Championship beating Woburn in a thriller at TD Garden in Boston and finally Hoosac Valley at Worcester's DCU Center. In 2008 and 2009 the girls cross country team went undefeated and in 2010 came in second at the MIAA Division 3 State Championships.

Fall Varsity Sports in Milton include: Cheerleading, Cross Country (Girls/Boys), Field Hockey, Football, Golf (Coed), Soccer (Girls/Boys), Volleyball (Co-ed). Winter Varsity Sports include Basketball (Girls/Boys), Cheerleading, Ice Hockey(Girls/Boys), Indoor Track and Field (Girls/Boys), Ski Team (Girls/Boys), Wrestling. Spring Varsity Sports include Baseball, Lacrosse(Girls/Boys), Outdoor Track, and Field (Girls/Boys), Softball, Tennis (Girls/Boys, Crew (Girls/Boys).

Spring Varsity Sports in Milton include: Crew (Girls/Boys).

The 2011-2012 Milton High School Boys Ice Hockey team were defeated by Burlington High school On March 19, 2012, at the state finals at the TD Garden in Boston.

Massachusetts Comprehensive Assessment System 
2006 MCAS Results (Grade 10):

Notable alumni
 Rich Hill (Minnesota Twins) 
 James Martorano 
 Johny Martorano 
 Keith Yandle (Florida Panthers)

References

External links
Official website

Bay State Conference
Milton, Massachusetts
Public high schools in Massachusetts
Schools in Norfolk County, Massachusetts